Jordan Palmer is an American social activist, Kentucky politician, civil rights activist, entrepreneur, and the founder of the Kentucky Equality Federation. Palmer is from Hazard, Kentucky and is credited for having Kentucky Constitutional Amendment 1 (banning same-sex marriage), being struck down by a Kentucky judge, pushing the first hate crime convictions under the Matthew Shepard and James Byrd Jr. Hate Crimes Prevention Act, and holding the first equality protests against a sitting governor and members of the Kentucky House of Representatives.

Personal life 
Palmer is the son of a Church of Christ minister whom he has no relationship with because Palmer is gay.

Gay rights 
In early 2006 Jordan founded Kentucky Equal Rights (later renamed Kentucky Equality Federation by a majority vote of its members) to advance the interests of gay, lesbian, bisexual, and transgender people in the Commonwealth of Kentucky. Palmer also served as on the Board of Directors and the Executive Vice President of Development of Marriage Equality USA based in San Francisco, California from 2007-2009.

Kentucky Equality Federation

Denied Marriage Licenses 
In February 2009 Palmer organized gay and lesbian couples going to county court clerks offices in Kentucky to apply for a same-sex marriage license only to be denied. Palmer told the media his intention was to raise awareness of Kentucky's ban on same-sex marriages. The action was condemned by the Family Foundation of Kentucky, which Palmer dismissed as "another example of how so-called family organizations are some of the most useless, money-hungry scams in the world with their bizarre and all-encompassing 'gay fetish.'"

Marriage Equality Lawsuit 

On September 10, 2013 the Kentucky Equality Federation sued the Commonwealth of Kentucky in Franklin Circuit Court claiming Kentucky's 2004 Constitutional Amendment banning same-sex marriage violated sections of the commonwealth's constitution.  Case # 13-CI-1074 was assigned by the Franklin County Court Clerk (the location of the Kentucky State Capitol). The lawsuit was conceived by President Jordan Palmer, written and signed by Vice President of Legal Jillian Hall, Esq.

Palmer stated to the media that:

Ruling 
On April 16, 2015, Kentucky Equality Federation v. Beshear also known as Kentucky Equality Federation v. Commonwealth of Kentucky was ruled on by Franklin County Circuit Court Judge Thomas D. Wingate. Judge Wingate sided with Kentucky Equality Federation against the Commonwealth and struck down Kentucky Constitutional Amendment banning same-sex marriages. Judge Wingate also struck down all laws passed by the Kentucky General Assembly. At the request of Governor Steve Beshear's legal representation, the Judge also placed a stay on the order pending a ruling from a Kentucky appellate court (such as the Kentucky Court of Appeals or Kentucky's court of last resort, the Kentucky Supreme Court) or the U.S. Supreme Court. The lawsuit was a significant victory for the Kentucky Equality Federation and the same-sex marriage civil rights movement.

Marriage Equality USA  
Palmer served on the board of directors of Marriage Equality USA from 2006-2009. Palmer worked across the state of California to fight 2008 California Proposition 8. During and after the No Prop 8 Campaign, Palmer told change.org and Time Magazine that he was concerned that the organization didn’t utilize the grassroots community to its potential and recognizing the harm associated with a campaign run by political consultants without sufficient accountability or transparency to the larger community.

First Hate Crime Convictions  
When Kevin Pennington was attacked in the Appalachian mountains, Palmer demanded the U.S. Department of Justice prosecute his assailants under the U.S. Matthew Shepherd and James Byrd Jr. Hate Crimes Prevention Act. Palmer succeeded and was active in the preparation of the trail. David Jason Jenkins, of Cumberland, and Anthony Ray Jenkins, of Partridge, was indicted and convicted in U.S. District Court in London, KY.

Politics
Palmer stepped down in 2012 from the Kentucky Equality Federation. In 2014, he is running for Kentucky State Senate. Palmer lost to the incumbent and returned to lead the Kentucky Equality Federation and its member organizations.

See also
 LGBT rights in the United States
 LGBT rights in Kentucky
 Same-sex marriage in Kentucky
 Same-sex marriage in the United States
 Matthew Shepard
 Westboro Baptist Church

References

External links
Official Website
Kentucky Equality Federation
Jordan Palmer on Twitter
Jordan Palmer on Facebook
Jordan Palmer on Instagram

American LGBT rights activists
LGBT rights in the United States
Kentucky Democrats
People from Hazard, Kentucky
Year of birth missing (living people)
Living people
Kentucky state case law
United States same-sex union case law
LGBT in Kentucky
2014 in United States case law
2014 in Kentucky
Discrimination against LGBT people in the United States
Discrimination in the United States
Hate crime